Louis E. "Doc" Skender (October 26, 1906 –  August 17, 1969) was an American football and baseball coach and college athletics administrator.  He served as the head baseball coach at Duquesne University from 1951 to 1969, compiling a record of 227–96.  Skender was also the athletic director at Duquesne from 1951 to 1969 and served one season, in 1950, as acting head football coach, tallying a mark of 2–6–1.  A native of Cherryville, Pennsylvania, Skender played college football at Duquesne as a tackle.  He died at the age of 63, on August 17, 1969, at St. Clair Memorial Hospital in Pittsburgh, Pennsylvania.

Head coaching record

References

External links
 

1906 births
1969 deaths
American football tackles
Duquesne Dukes athletic directors
Duquesne Dukes baseball coaches
Duquesne Dukes football coaches
Duquesne Dukes football players
Sportspeople from Northampton County, Pennsylvania
People from Washington County, Pennsylvania
Coaches of American football from Pennsylvania
Players of American football from Pennsylvania
Baseball coaches from Pennsylvania